Kylix rugifera is a species of sea snail, a marine gastropod mollusk in the family Drilliidae.

Description
The shell has a very dark chocolate color. The whorls are longitudinally ribbed with the ribs terminating on a nodulous periphery, above which the surface is smooth and slightly concave. The lower portion of the body whorl has revolving striae. The shell reaches a length of 22 mm.

Distribution
Tjis species occurs in the demersal zone of the Pacific Ocean off the Galapagos Islands and Panama.

References

  Tucker, J.K. 2004 Catalog of recent and fossil turrids (Mollusca: Gastropoda). Zootaxa 682:1–1295

External links
 

rugifera
Gastropods described in 1834